Mahe, Mahé, Mähe, or MAHE may refer to:

Places
China
 Mahe Township (lit. "Horse Creek Village") in Li County in Gansu

Estonia
 Mähe, a subdistrict of Tallinn, Estonia

India
 Mahé, India, a municipality in Mahé district and former French colony
 Mahé district, one of the four districts of the Union Territory of Puducherry in India
 Mahe (Union Territory Assembly constituency), the assembly constituency representing the above district
 Mahé River, a river in India
 Mahe, Ladakh, a town in Ladakh, India

Seychelles
 Mahé, Seychelles, the main island in the Republic of Seychelles

Education
 Manipal Academy of Higher Education, a deemed university located in Manipal, Karnataka, India
 Master of Arts in Higher Education, a student affairs-related degree

People
 Ma He (馬和), birth name of Zheng He (1371–1433 or 1435), Ming dynasty explorer

Surname
 Isabel Ge Mahe (born 1973/1974), Chinese businesswoman
 Reno Mahe (born 1980), American football player
 Stéphane Mahé (born 1968), French footballer

Given name
 Bertrand-François Mahé de La Bourdonnais (1699−1753), French naval officer and administrator, namesake of Mahé, Seychelles
 Mahé Drysdale (born 1978), New Zealand sculler

Other uses
 Mahé day gecko, a species of lizard endemic to the Seychelles

See also
 Malé